Frank Folke Furstenberg Jr. (born 1940) is the Zellerbach Family Professor of Sociology, Emeritus, at the University of Pennsylvania. His research focuses on the family in the context of disadvantaged urban neighborhoods and adolescent sexual behavior. Furstenberg has written extensively on social change, transition to adulthood, divorce, remarriage and intergenerational relations. Furstenberg is an elected member of the National Academy of Medicine, American Academy of Arts and Sciences, and American Academy of Political and Social Science.

Early life and education 
Frank Furstenberg was born in Baltimore, Maryland, into an established Jewish family.  His father, Frank Furstenberg, Sr., was a prominent physician and advocate for national health care and his mother, Edith Hollander Furstenberg was a social worker and family matriarch. His siblings include the late founding owner of Politics and Prose, Carla Furstenberg Cohen, the master baker, Mark Furstenberg, Michael Furstenberg, Anne Furstenberg and Ellen Furstenberg.

Furstenberg received a Bachelor of Arts degree from Haverford College in 1961 and a Ph.D. degree in sociology from Columbia University in 1967. He joined the University of Pennsylvania sociology department as a professor in 1967. His honors include fellowships from John Simon Guggenheim Memorial Foundation, Russell Sage Foundation and Woodrow Wilson National Fellowship Foundation.

Academic contributions 

Furstenberg spent his academic career in the Sociology Department at the University of Pennsylvania as the Zellerbach Family Professor, where he remained until he retired. He was a visiting fellow at the Center for Advanced Study in the Behavioral Sciences, Russell Sage Foundation, London School of Economics and Political Science, National University of Singapore, and Bocconi University.

Furstenberg published important early work on the underlying components of teenage pregnancy in books, including: 
 Unplanned parenthood: The social consequences of teenage childbearing, 1976. The Free Press
Teenage sexuality, pregnancy, and childbearing, edited with Richard Lincoln and Jane Menken, 1981. University of Pennsylvania Press
Adolescent mothers in later life, with J. Brooks-Gunn and S. Philip Morgan. 1987. New York: Cambridge University Press
Managing to make it: Urban families in high-risk neighborhoods, with Thomas Cook, Jacquelynne Eccles, Glen H. Elder Jr., and Arnold Sameroff.  1999.  Chicago: University of Chicago Press
On the frontiers of adulthood: Theory, research, and public policy, edited with Richard A. Settersten Jr. and Rubén G. Rumbaut. 2005. University of Chicago Press
Destinies of the disadvantaged: The politics of teenage childbearing, 2007. Russell Sage Foundation

In an opinion piece, Furstenberg explores the value of marriage and suggests that government policies should focus on creating economic and social conditions, such as child care subsidies, paid parental leaves, and cheaper health insurance, that will support marriage for low-income families.

Furstenberg has also written extensively on divorce, remarriage and intergenerational relations in books including, The new American grandparent: A place in the family, a life apart, with Andrew J. Cherlin, 1986. Basic Books and Divided families: What happens to children when parents part, with Andrew J. Cherlin, 1991. Harvard University Press. He also writes about intergenerational issues, including the launch of college graduates in opinion pieces.

As well, Furstenberg has written about the elements of an academic career in books and articles, such as Behind the academic curtain: How to find success and happiness with a Ph.D., 2013. University of Chicago Press, reviewed in Inside Higher Ed, and How I became a developmentalist, 2013. In The developmental science of adolescence: History through autobiography.

Personal life 

Furstenberg is married to Nina Segre.  Together they have five children and six grandchildren and live in Philadelphia. His nephew, François Furstenberg, is a historian at Johns Hopkins University.

References

External links 
Furstenberg's website at University of Pennsylvania
Furstenberg's author page

1940 births
Living people
Haverford College alumni
Columbia Graduate School of Arts and Sciences alumni
American sociologists
University of Pennsylvania faculty
Members of the National Academy of Medicine